Tangkeng station, is a station of Shenzhen Metro Line 3. It opened on 28 December 2010. It is an underground station located at Shenhui Road.

Station layout

Exits

References

External links
 Shenzhen Metro Tangkeng Station (Chinese)
 Shenzhen Metro Tangkeng Station (English)

Shenzhen Metro stations
Railway stations in Guangdong
Longgang District, Shenzhen
Railway stations in China opened in 2010